Valentin Shashin (1916–1977) was a Soviet engineer who served as the minister of oil industry for more than a decade, 1965–1977.

Biography
Shashin was born in Baku in 1916. He was first educated at the Oil and Gas Training College. He graduated from Moscow Oil Institute in 1943 obtaining a degree in oil and gas engineering. While attending the Institute Shashin participated in the defense of Moscow against Nazi Germany. From 1947 to 1953 he worked as a chief engineer in various gas fields in Bashkiria. Next he headed a state-run oil company, Tatneft, between 1960 and 1965. Shashin was appointed minister of oil producing industry in 1965 when the ministry was established. In the 1970s the ministry was renamed as ministry of oil industry.

Shashin died in March 1977 while serving as the minister of oil industry. He was succeeded by Nikolai A. Maltsev who was appointed to the post in April 1977.

References

External links

20th-century Russian engineers
1916 births
1977 deaths
Central Committee of the Communist Party of the Soviet Union members
People's commissars and ministers of the Soviet Union
Soviet engineers
Politicians from Baku
Petroleum engineers
Soviet military personnel of World War II from Azerbaijan